Michael López may refer to:

 Michael López-Alegría (born 1958) 
 Michael López (Argentine footballer) (born 1997) 
 Michael López (Chilean footballer) (born 1989)
 Michael López (Colombian footballer) (born 1997)